The 1982 Mid-Eastern Athletic Conference men's basketball tournament took place March 5–7 at Winston-Salem Memorial Coliseum in Winston-Salem, North Carolina. North Carolina A&T defeated , 79–67 in the championship game, to win the MEAC Tournament title.

The Aggies earned an automatic bid to the 1982 NCAA tournament as a No. 12 seed in the West region.

Format
All seven conference members participated, with play beginning in the quarterfinal round. Teams were seeded based on their regular season conference record.

Bracket

* denotes overtime period

References

MEAC men's basketball tournament
1981–82 Mid-Eastern Athletic Conference men's basketball season
MEAC men's basketball tournament